The New Alcazar Hotel also known as Alcazar Hotel is a historic building in Clarksdale, Mississippi. Once considered one of the premier hotels in the South, the Alcazar Hotel hosted guest such as playwright Tennessee Williams. Located in the hotel was a restaurant and several other businesses, including WROX radio station which broadcast from the hotel for 40 years.

History 
The original Alcazar Hotel was built in 1895; it was destroyed by arson set by a former employee in 1947. The new hotel was built by architect Charles O. Pfeil of Memphis; completed by 1915. Billed it as the "most modern hotel in Mississippi," it had a glass dome skylight was more spacious than the original. The building was four-stories with eleven storefront bays where prominent Clarksdale businesses operated. The hotel was remodeled in 1938 to include private bath in each room. About a decade later a mezzanine level was introduced in between the first and second floors c. 1948.

In the 1940s, musician Ike Turner operated the elevator in the hotel as a pre-teen. He was also worked as a deejay at WROX radio located in the hotel.  Musicians like Elvis Presley, Muddy Waters, Ike & Tina Turner, and B.B. King performed live at WROX and were interviewed by Early Wright, the first black deejay in Mississippi.

The Alcazar Hotel and Coffee Shop were an all white restaurant and hotel owned by Clarksdale King Anderson Company. The general manager of the hotel was Fred E. Pelegrin and he assisted his wife in managing the coffee shop. After the Civil Rights Act of 1964 was passed, the employees of the Alcazar Hotel and the Alcazar Coffee Shop were instructed by Clarksdale King Anderson Company to "refuse service to Negroes." According to the US District Court ruling filed in November 1965, Reverend George W. Trotter III of Memphis, a black man, attempted to obtain a room at the hotel on July 6, 1964, and Mrs. Vera Mae Pigee of Clarksdale, a black woman, attempted to obtain service at the coffee shop; both were refused because of their race. The next day, the owners closed the hotel and coffee shop to avoid serving black customers. A few weeks later on July 27, the Regency Club was founded as a whites only private club, working in conjunction with Clarksdale King Anderson for use of the hotel, coffee shop, and staff. In December 1965, the court ruled against the discriminatory practices, barring the hotel from operating in cahoots with the club.

The Alcazar Hotel was eventually closed and the building was used for other commercial purposes. WROX moved out of the building in the 1990s. The hotel was added to the National Register of Historic Places in 1994. In 2009, the hotel was listed as one of the 10 Most Endangered Historic Places in Mississippi by the Mississippi Heritage Trust. There have been plans to facilitate the building, but as of 2017, the building which has been repainted and weatherproofed remains vacant.

References 

Hotels established in 1915
Hotel buildings completed in 1915
1915 establishments in Mississippi
Mississippi Landmarks
Hotel buildings on the National Register of Historic Places in Mississippi
Commercial buildings on the National Register of Historic Places in Mississippi
National Register of Historic Places in Coahoma County, Mississippi
Clarksdale, Mississippi